The Mali series of graphics processing units (GPUs) and multimedia processors are semiconductor intellectual property cores produced by Arm Holdings for licensing in various ASIC designs by Arm partners.

Mali GPUs were developed by Falanx Microsystems A/S, which was a spin-off of a research project from the Norwegian University of Science and Technology. Arm Holdings acquired Falanx Microsystems A/S on June 23, 2006 and renamed the company to Arm Norway.

Originally named Malaik, the team shortened the name to Mali, Serbo-Croatian for "small", which was thought to be fitting for a mobile GPU.

Technical details
Like other embedded IP cores for 3D rendering acceleration, the Mali GPU does not include display controllers driving monitors, in contrast to common desktop video cards. Instead, the Mali ARM core is a pure 3D engine that renders graphics into memory and passes the rendered image over to another core to handle display.

ARM does, however, license display controller SIP cores independently of the Mali 3D accelerator SIP block, e.g. Mali DP500, DP550 and DP650.

ARM also supplies tools to help in authoring OpenGL ES shaders named Mali GPU Shader Development Studio and Mali GPU User Interface Engine.

Display controllers such as the ARM HDLCD display controller are available separately.

Variants
The Mali core grew out of the cores previously produced by Falanx and currently constitute:

Some microarchitectures (or just some chips?) support cache coherency for the L2 cache with the CPU.

Adaptive Scalable Texture Compression (ASTC) is supported by Mali-T620, T720/T760, T820/T830/T860/T880 and Mali-G series.

Implementations
The Mali GPU variants can be found in the following systems on chips (SoCs):

Mali video processors 
Mali Video is the name given to ARM Holdings' dedicated video decoding and video encoding ASIC. There are multiple versions implementing a number of video codecs, such as HEVC, VP9, H.264 and VP8. As with all ARM products, the Mali video processor is a semiconductor intellectual property core licensed to third parties for inclusion in their chips. Real time encode-decode capability is central to videotelephony. An interface to ARM's TrustZone technology is also built-in to enable digital rights management of copyrighted material.

Mali-V500 
The first version of a Mali Video processor was the V500, released in 2013 with the Mali-T622 GPU. The V500 is a multicore design, sporting 1–8 cores, with support for H.264 and a protected video path using ARM TrustZone. The 8 core version is sufficient for 4K video decode at 120 frames per second (fps). The V500 can encode VP8 and H.264, and decode H.264, H.263, MPEG4, MPEG2, VC-1/WMV, Real, VP8.

Mali-V550 
Released with the Mali-T800 GPU, ARM V550 video processors added both encode and decode HEVC support, 10-bit color depth, and technologies to further reduced power consumption. The V550 also included technology improvements to better handle latency and save bandwidth. Again built around the idea of a scalable number of cores (1–8) the V550 could support between 1080p60 (1 core) to 4K120 (8 cores). The V550 supported HEVC Main, H.264, VP8, JPEG encode, and HEVC Main 10, HEVC Main, H.264, H.263, MPEG4, MPEG2, VC-1/WMV, Real, VP8, JPEG decode.

Mali-V61 
The Mali V61 video processor (formerly named Egil) was released with the Mali Bifrost GPU in 2016. V61 has been designed to improve video encoding, in particular HEVC and VP9, and to allow for encoding either a single or multiple streams simultaneously. The design continues the 1–8 variable core number design, with a single core supporting 1080p60 while 8 cores can drive 4Kp120. It can decode and encode VP9 10-bit, VP9 8-bit, HEVC Main 10, HEVC Main, H.264, VP8, JPEG and decode only MPEG4, MPEG2, VC-1/WMV, Real, H.263.

Mali-V52 
The Mali V52 video processor was released with the Mali G52 and G31 GPUs in March 2018. The processor is intended to support 4K (including HDR) video on mainstream devices.

The platform is scalable from 1 to 4 cores and doubles the decode performance relative to V61. It also adds High 10 H.264 encode (Level 5.0) and decode (Level 5.1) capabilities, as well as AVS Part 2 (Jizhun) and Part 16 (AVS+, Guangdian) decode capability for YUV420.

Mali-V76 
The Mali V76 video processor was released with the Mali G76 GPU and Cortex-A76 CPU in 2018. The V76 was designed to improve video encoding and decoding performance. The design continues the 2–8 variable core number design, with 8 cores capable of 8Kp60 decoding and 8Kp30 encoding. It claims improves HEVC encode quality by 25% relative to Mali-V61 at launch.
The AV1 codec is not supported.

Mali-V77 
The Mali V77 video processor was released with the Mali G77 GPU and Cortex-A77 CPU in 2019.

Comparison

Mali display processors

Mali-D71 
The Mali-D71 added Arm Framebuffer Compression (AFBC) 1.2 encoder, support for ARM CoreLink MMU-600 and Assertive Display 5. Assertive Display 5 has support for HDR10 and hybrid log–gamma (HLG).

Mali-D77 
The Mali-D77 added features including asynchronous timewarp (ATW), lens distortion correction (LDC), and chromatic aberration correction (CAC). The Mali-D77 is also capable of 3K (2880x1440) @ 120 Hz and 4K @ 90 Hz.

Mali Camera

Mali-C71 
On April 25, 2017 the Mali-C71 was announced, ARM's first image signal processor (ISP).

Mali-C52 and Mali-C32 
On January 3, 2019 the Mali-C52 and C32 were announced, aimed at everyday devices including drones, smart home assistants and security, and internet protocol (IP) camera.

Mali-C71AE 
On September 29, 2020 the Mali-C71AE image signal processor was introduced, alongside the Cortex-A78AE CPU and Mali-G78AE GPU. It supports up to 4 real-time cameras or up to 16 virtual cameras with a maximum resolution of 4096 x 4096 each.

Mali-C55 
On June 8, 2022 the Mali-C55 ISP was introduced as successor to the C52. It is the smallest and most configurable image signal processor from Arm, and support up to 8 camera with a max resolution of 48 megapixel each. Arm claims improved tone mapping and spatial noise reduction compared to the C52. Multiple C55 ISPs can be combined to support higher than 48 megapixel resolutions.

Comparison

The Lima and Panfrost FOSS drivers

On January 21, 2012, Phoronix reported that Luc Verhaegen was driving a reverse-engineering attempt aimed at the Mali series of GPUs, specifically the Mali 200 and Mali 400 versions. The project was known as Lima and targeted support for OpenGL ES 2.0. The reverse-engineering project was presented at FOSDEM, February 4, 2012, followed by the opening of a website demonstrating some renders. On February 2, 2013, Verhaegen demonstrated Quake III Arena in timedemo mode, running on top of the Lima driver. In May 2018, a Lima developer posted the driver for inclusion in the Linux kernel. In May 2019, the Lima driver became part of the mainline Linux kernel. The Mesa userspace counterpart was merged at the same time. It currently supports OpenGL ES 1.1, 2.0 and parts of 2.1, and the fallback emulation in MESA provides full support for graphical desktop environments.

Panfrost is a reverse-engineered driver effort for Mali Txxx (Midgard) and Gxx (Bifrost) GPUs. Introducing Panfrost talk was presented at X.Org Developer's Conference 2018. As of May 2019, the Panfrost driver is part of the mainline Linux kernel. and MESA. Panfrost supports OpenGL ES 2.0, 3.0 and 3.1, as well as OpenGL 3.1.

See also
 Adreno – GPU developed by Qualcomm (formerly AMD, then Freescale)
 Atom family of SoCs – with Intel graphics core, not licensed to third parties
 AMD mobile APUs – with AMD graphics core, licensed to Samsung
 PowerVR – by Imagination Technologies
 Tegra – family of SoCs by Nvidia with the graphics core available as a SIP block to third parties
 VideoCore – family of SoCs by Broadcom with the graphics core available as a SIP block to third parties
 Vivante – available as SIP block to third parties
Imageon – old AMD mobile GPU

References

External links
 Graphics Processing from ARM website
 Mali Developer Center  a developer focused site run by ARM
 V500
 V550
 Lima driver

ARM architecture
Graphics processing units